Masoud Soltanifar (born 5 February 1960 in Tehran, Iran) is an Iranian politician, historian and the former Minister of Youth Affairs and Sports from 1 November 2016 to 25 August 2021. He was previously Vice President of Iran and head of Cultural Heritage, Handcrafts and Tourism Organization. He is the former member of City Council of Tehran and Governor of Gilan Province. He was previously deputy head of Physical Education Organization and Hassan Rouhani's candidate for Ministry of Youth Affairs and Sports, a nomination that rejected by the parliament. In October 2016, he was again nominated for the position and was approved by the new parliament. He is a member of National Trust Party, as well as Moderation and Development Party.

References

External links

20th-century Iranian historians
1960 births
Living people
National Trust Party (Iran) politicians
Moderation and Development Party politicians
Heads of Cultural Heritage, Handicrafts and Tourism Organization
Tehran Councillors 2013–2017